The 2020 United States House of Representatives election in Alaska was held on November 3, 2020, to elect the U.S. representative from Alaska's at-large congressional district. The election coincided with the 2020 U.S. presidential election, as well as other elections to the House of Representatives, elections to the United States Senate and various state and local elections.

This was Don Young’s last reelection as he died in office on March 18, 2022. As of 2022, this is the last election in which a Republican won Alaska's only congressional district. Also, it was the last Alaska congressional election conducted by plurality voting.

Background
The incumbent in this election was Republican Don Young, who was re-elected with 53.1% of the vote in 2018, in what was one of the closest elections of his long career. Young was the longest-tenured member of the U.S. House of Representatives, having been first elected in a 1973 special election. He served on several committees including as a ranking member of a House Natural Resources subcommittee. In 2019, Young introduced 37 bills, four of which made it out of committee.

Challenging Young was independent candidate Alyse Galvin. Galvin is a small business owner, former teacher, and founder of the non-profit Great Alaska Schools. Galvin has never held public office. Galvin's platform focused on addressing climate change, increasing funding for public schools, and lowering health care costs. Galvin ran as an independent and also received the Democratic Party nomination.

Republican primary

Candidates

Declared
 Gerald L. Heikes
 Thomas "John" Nelson, businessman and candidate for this seat in 2018
 Don Young, incumbent U.S. Representative

Results

Democratic primary

Candidates

Declared
 Alyse Galvin (Independent), public education advocate and nominee for Alaska's at-large congressional district in 2018
 Bill Hibler (Democratic), candidate for Alaska's at-large congressional district in 2016
 Ray Sean Tugatuk (Democratic)

Endorsements

Results

Independents

Withdrawn
 Thomas Lamb

General election

Predictions

Polling

Results

Notes

Partisan clients

References

External links
 
 
  (state affiliate of the U.S. League of Women Voters)
 

Official campaign websites
 Alyse Galvin (I) for Congress
 Don Young (R) for Congress

Alaska
2020
United States House of Representatives